p Carinae is the Bayer designation of a star in the southern constellation of Carina. It has the variable star designation PP Carinae and, at an apparent visual magnitude of +3.3, is readily visible to the naked eye from the southern hemisphere. It is considered to be a member of the open cluster IC 2602 although it lies well outside the core visible group of stars.

The star is a B-type main sequence star with a stellar classification of B4 Vne. The 'ne' suffix indicates it is a rapidly rotating Be star that is surrounded by hot circumstellar gas. This material adds emission lines to the spectrum of the star. This star is classified as a Gamma Cassiopeiae-type variable and its brightness varies from magnitude +3.22 to +3.55.

In most versions of its asterism, the neighbouring bright stars, thus plotted along the imaginary hull forming Carina are Theta Carinae, to the south, and V337 (also known as lower case q) Carinae to the east, of second and third magnitude respectively.

References

Carinae, p
B-type main-sequence stars
Carina (constellation)
Gamma Cassiopeiae variable stars
Carinae, PP
091465
4140
IC 2602
051576
PD-61 01704